Georges-Émile Lebacq (26 September 1876 – 4 August 1950) was a Belgian painter.

Biography

A Post-Impressionist and Impressionist painter, Lebacq was alternately a watercolourist, pastellist and portrait, landscape and still life painter. He also painted church interiors (stained-glass windows and paintings). Certain works as "Lumière d'été à Cagnes-sur-Mer" or "Le Repos en Terrasse" are impressionist. Initially self-taught, he first exhibited while a soldier during World War I. After the war he enrolled as a student at the Académie Julian at Paris in 1920, and thereafter worked mainly in France.

Work

Most of Lebacq's paintings are in Beaux-Arts Mons ("BAM", the museum of fine arts in Mons, Belgium), the Musée de la Venerie in Senlis, France, the Musée Renoir in Cagnes-sur-Mer, France, the Royal Museum of the Armed Forces and Military History in Brussels, or in private collections.

Gallery

References

External links

 Musée de Cagnes sur mer (Château Grimaldi)
 Musée de la Vénerie à Senlis (Oise)
 Musée des Beaux-Arts de Mons (Belgique)
 Musée Royal de l'Armée et d'Histoire Militaire, Bruxelles (Belgique)
  Musée d'Art Moderne de Paris (MAM)
 Georges Émile Lebacq dans la *base joconde

1876 births
1950 deaths
People from Mons
Belgian painters
Belgian Impressionist painters
Académie Julian alumni